Saint Lawrence is an unincorporated community located in the towns of Addison and Hartford, Washington County, Wisconsin, United States.

Notable people
Ben Lang, farmer, businessman, and politician, was born in Saint Lawrence.

Notes

Unincorporated communities in Washington County, Wisconsin
Unincorporated communities in Wisconsin